Jean Mateu (19 October 1907 – 26 February 1983) was a Spanish racing cyclist. He rode in the 1930 Tour de France.

References

External links
 

1907 births
1983 deaths
Spanish male cyclists
Place of birth missing
People from Alt Camp
Sportspeople from the Province of Tarragona
Cyclists from Catalonia